Nikita Valeryevich Korobov (born 5 September 1999) is a Russian football player. He plays for FC Kaluga.

Club career
He made his debut in the Russian Football National League for FC Tom Tomsk on 11 July 2021 in a game against FC Metallurg Lipetsk.

References

External links
 
 Profile by Russian Football National League

1999 births
People from Orekhovo-Zuyevsky District
Sportspeople from Moscow Oblast
Living people
Russian footballers
Association football midfielders
FC Saturn Ramenskoye players
FC Tom Tomsk players
Russian Second League players
Russian First League players